The following highways are numbered 68:

Australia 
  Channel Highway (Tasmania)
  NSW (Multiple routes)

Canada
 Alberta Highway 68
 Manitoba Highway 68
 Ontario Highway 68

Chile
Chile Route 68

India
 National Highway 68 (India)

Korea, South
Gukjido 68

Philippines
 N68 highway (Philippines)

Poland 
  National road 68

United States
 Interstate 68
 Interstate 68 (Maryland 1975) (former proposal)
 U.S. Route 68
 Alabama State Route 68
 Arizona State Route 68
 Arkansas Highway 68 (former)
 California State Route 68
 Colorado State Highway 68 (former)
 Connecticut Route 68
 Florida State Road 68
 County Road 68 (Okeechobee County, Florida)
 County Road 68 (St. Lucie County, Florida)
 Georgia State Route 68
 Georgia State Route 68 (1921–1932) (former)
 Illinois Route 68
 Indiana State Road 68
 Iowa Highway 68 (former)
 K-68 (Kansas highway)
 Louisiana Highway 68
 Louisiana State Route 68 (former)
 Maryland Route 68
 Massachusetts Route 68
 M-68 (Michigan highway)
 Minnesota State Highway 68
 County Road 68 (Ramsey County, Minnesota)
 Missouri Route 68
Missouri Route 68 (1922) (former)
 Nebraska Highway 68
 Nevada State Route 68 (former)
 New Jersey Route 68
 County Route 68 (Bergen County, New Jersey)
 New Mexico State Road 68
 New York State Route 68
 County Route 68 (Chautauqua County, New York)
 County Route 68 (Dutchess County, New York)
 County Route 68 (Erie County, New York)
 County Route 68 (Herkimer County, New York)
 County Route 68 (Oneida County, New York)
 County Route 68 (Putnam County, New York)
 County Route 68 (Rensselaer County, New York)
 County Route 68 (Rockland County, New York)
 County Route 68 (Steuben County, New York)
 County Route 68 (Suffolk County, New York)
 County Route 68 (Westchester County, New York)
 North Carolina Highway 68
 North Dakota Highway 68
 Ohio State Route 68 (1923) (former)
 Pennsylvania Route 68
 South Carolina Highway 68
 Tennessee State Route 68
 Texas State Highway 68 (proposed)
 Texas State Highway 68 (pre-1942) (former)
 Texas State Highway Loop 68 (former)
 Texas State Highway Spur 68 (former)
 Farm to Market Road 68
 Texas Park Road 68
 Utah State Route 68
 Vermont Route 68 (former)
 Virginia State Route 68
 West Virginia Route 68
 Wisconsin Highway 68

Territories
 U.S. Virgin Islands Highway 68

See also
A68 (disambiguation)